Nicole Arsenault Bishop (born October 28, 1981) is a Canadian curler from Riverview, New Brunswick. She currently serves as the alternate for the Melissa Adams rink.

Career
Arsenault Bishop played in her first New Brunswick Scotties Tournament of Hearts in 2015 as second for the Melissa Adams rink. They defeated Shannon Tatlock in the semifinal before losing the final to the Sylvie Robichaud rink. The following year, she left the Adams rink and joined the Robichaud team as their alternate. They would go on to win the 2016 New Brunswick Scotties Tournament of Hearts and represent New Brunswick at the 2016 Scotties Tournament of Hearts where they finished with a 2–9 record. In 2016, she moved up to play second. They couldn't defend their provincial title, losing the tiebreaker to Sarah Mallais. The following year, Arsenault Bishop's former teammate Melissa Adams joined the team at third. It proved to be a successful addition as the Robichaud rink won the 2018 New Brunswick Scotties Tournament of Hearts. They would have more success this time at the National Championship, finishing the new pool play format with a 4–3 record. This placed them fifth in their pool, not enough to qualify for the Championship Pool. The following season, her rink would win the 2018 Tim Hortons Spitfire Arms Cash Spiel on the World Curling Tour. They could not defend their provincial title at the 2019 New Brunswick Scotties Tournament of Hearts where they lost to the Sarah Mallais rink in the semifinal.

After failing to win the provincial championship in 2020 as well, Team Quillian disbanded. Sylvie Quillian joined the Andrea Crawford rink whereas Melissa Adams and Kendra Lister formed a new team. Due to the COVID-19 pandemic in New Brunswick, the 2021 provincial championship was cancelled. As the reigning provincial champions, Team Crawford was given the invitation to represent New Brunswick at the 2021 Scotties Tournament of Hearts, but they declined due to work and family commitments. Team Adams was then invited in their place, which they accepted. Adams' third Justine Comeau could not attend the event however due to being a student, leaving Arsenault Bishop to take her place. At the Hearts, they finished with a 3–5 round robin record, failing to qualify for the championship round.

Personal life
Arsenault Bishop is employed as the executive director and registrar of the New Brunswick Association of Dietitians.

Teams

References

External links

Canadian women curlers
Curlers from New Brunswick
Living people
Sportspeople from Moncton
1981 births
People from Riverview, New Brunswick